Elections to Weymouth and Portland Borough Council in Dorset took place on Thursday 3 May 2012.

After the election, the composition of the council was:
Conservative 14
Labour 11
Liberal Democrat 8
Independent 3

Election result

Gain/loss is relative to the 2008 results.

Ward results

Farrell had been elected as a Liberal Democrat in 2008.

Munro (incumbent) had been elected as an Independent in 2008.

References

2012 English local elections
2012
2010s in Dorset